Spokane Flyers could mean:

Spokane Flyers (senior), a former senior ice hockey team in the Western International Hockey League
Spokane Flyers (junior), a former junior ice hockey team in the Western Hockey League